The Ōtere River is a short river of the Tasman Region of New Zealand's South Island. It flows north to reach Golden Bay approximately halfway between Tākaka and Collingwood, flowing into an inlet at the remnants of Onekaka Wharf.

See also
List of rivers of New Zealand

References

Rivers of the Tasman District
Rivers of New Zealand